Ferdy Druijf (born 12 February 1998) is a Dutch professional footballer who plays as a forward for Austrian Bundesliga club Rapid Wien.

Club career
He made his Eerste Divisie debut for Jong AZ on 18 August 2017 in a game against FC Den Bosch.

On 4 January 2019, Druijf was loaned out to NEC for the rest of the season.

On 13 January 2021, Druijf was loaned until the end of the season to Belgian side, Mechelen. He made his debut three days later as a substitute in a 0–1 away win over Charleroi.

On 3 February 2022, Druijf moved on a new loan to Rapid Wien in Austria.

On 1 July 2022, Rapid Wien announced the move of Druijf to the club with a three year contract.

International career
Druijf represented the Netherlands national under-20 football team.

Career statistics

References

External links
 
 

1998 births
Footballers from North Holland
People from Uitgeest
Living people
Association football forwards
Dutch footballers
Netherlands youth international footballers
AZ Alkmaar players
Jong AZ players
NEC Nijmegen players
K.V. Mechelen players
SK Rapid Wien players
Eredivisie players
Eerste Divisie players
Belgian Pro League players
Dutch expatriate footballers
Expatriate footballers in Belgium
Dutch expatriate sportspeople in Belgium
Expatriate footballers in Austria
Dutch expatriate sportspeople in Austria